Crediton railway station is a railway station serving the town of Crediton in Devon, England.

It is the junction of the Tarka and Dartmoor lines, though the two lines run parallel until Coleford Junction (where the junction of the Barnstaple and Okehampton lines used to be) at Penstone near Coleford (west of Yeoford).

History

The Exeter and Crediton Railway was ready to be opened in 1847 but a dispute over the track gauge prevented its opening until 12 May 1851. The  gauge trains were operated by the Bristol and Exeter Railway (B&ER). Both these railway companies were largely funded by the London and South Western Railway (LSWR) who took control of them in 1855 and 1879 respectively. The LSWR laid additional rails to allow their  gauge trains to reach Crediton in 1862 and Barnstaple in 1863, although the B&ER (and later, the Great Western Railway) continued to run freight trains on the broad gauge.

The main goods yard was situated on the north side of the line at the Exeter end of the station with road access from the main station approach. One long siding ran through a goods shed for general traffic nd another long siding served various short sidings which handled, among other traffic, livestock and coal. Another siding west of the level crossing was used by Copp & Company. The creamery and dairy in Crediton is located next to the church, but the company's transport depot was located in Hoskin's Yard next to the station. The milk was brought to the station in a lorry and pumped into a milk tank wagon then taken to London in a train with other milk tanks from the larger creamery at Lapford railway station.

Passenger staff were withdrawn from the station in the mid-1960s and the goods yard closed on 4 December 1967. The route to Plymouth had been closed from 6 May 1968 although a service from Exeter to Okehampton continued to operate until 3 June 1972 after which the line only carried traffic from the quarry at Meldon. Since 17 October 1971 the two tracks west of Crediton operated as two single lines, the former down line serving Okehampton and the former up line trains on the Barnstaple route. From 17 December 1984 the line east of Crediton was also singled with trains to and from Exeter using a single track between Crediton and Cowley Bridge Junction. Passenger services to Okehampton resumed on 20 November 2021, initially once every two hours but an hourly service was operated from 15 May 2022.

Stationmasters

Mr. Tamlins ca. 1852 ca. 1853
Charles Spencer ca. 1861
John Vickery 1864 - 1875 
George Vallance 1876
Thomas B. Taplin 1876 - 1882 
John Banks 1883 - 1912 
T. Johnson 1912 - ca. 1924
Alfred Ernest Hurst 1926 - 1931
W.E. Jerrett 1932 - 1934
Mr. Reeves
S. Tett ca. 1937 - 1944 (moved to )

Description
It has two platforms and includes four Grade II listed buildings and a Grade II listed footbridge which date from 1847 to 1878. The main building on the up (to Exeter) platform was built in 1847 and is constructed in Flemish-bonded red brick with Bath stone dressings and a gabled slate roof. It has been claimed to be an Isambard Kingdom Brunel design however the engineer for the Exeter and Crediton Railway was Robert Dymond and this would have been his responsibility. The timber waiting rooms on both platforms might date from 1862 as they are of London and South Western Railway design. A smaller 1847 brick building used to be on the down platform to the east of the current waiting room but has been demolished.

A plate girder footbridge links the two platforms and was erected in 1878. It has stone piers supporting four sets of wooden steps. The wide bridge has railings down the centre which allowed people on one side to cross between platforms, and on the other side to cross the line when the level crossing gates were closed across the road. The signal box on the north side of the line beyond the level crossing dates from 1875 (although the listed building records suggests 1862)

Services

All services at Crediton are operated by Great Western Railway.

Signalling

When the station first opened, train were controlled by disc and crossbar signals controlled individually. Semphore signals controlled by two signal boxes were introduced in 1875 When the second track towards Exeter was added in 1875. Both boxes were on the north side of the line, one at each end of the station. All control was concentrated at Crediton West box in 1916 but the old East box was retained as a ground frame to control the connection to the goods yard.

On 17 October 1971 the junction for the Okehampton line at Coleford was closed and Crediton became the junction instead, leaving two single tracks westwards to Coleford. The London South Western style signals were replaced by Great Western Railway style signals at this time. The level crossing gates were replaced by lifting barriers in 1974. Further change occurred on 16 December 1984 when the line from Crediton to Cowley Bridge Junction in Exeter was reduced to a single track and all signals at Crediton were replaced by colour light signals. The mechanical lever frame in Crediton signal box was replaced by an electric panel. There is now no signal box beyond Crediton on either line, the two single tracks are controlled by tokens which ensures there is just one train on the line at any time.

Community railway
The railway between Exeter and Barnstaple is promoted as the Tarka Line. It is designated as a community railway and supported by the Devon and Cornwall Rail Partnership.

The Friends of Crediton Station actively promote the station and have been involved in schemes such as planting flower beds. The main station building at Crediton contains the Tea Rooms which are operated by the Turning Tides Project community group. These appeared in a list of "highly commended" station cafes published in The Guardian in 2009.

References

External links

Video footage of Crediton Station 10 2016
Video footage of Crediton station following the re-opening of the Okehampton line in 2021

Railway stations in Devon
Railway stations in Great Britain opened in 1851
Former London and South Western Railway stations
Railway stations served by Great Western Railway
Isambard Kingdom Brunel railway stations
1851 establishments in England
Industrial archaeological sites in Devon
Crediton
Grade II listed buildings in Devon
DfT Category F1 stations